Crenicichla semicincta is a species of cichlid native to South America. It is found in the Amazon River basin, in the Madre de Dios River drainage in Peru, and in the Mamoré River basin.

References

Kullander, S.O., 1986. Cichlid fishes of the Amazon River drainage of Peru. Department of Vertebrate Zoology, Research Division, Swedish Museum of Natural History, Stockholm, Sweden, 394 p.

semicincta
Freshwater fish of Peru
Fish of the Amazon basin
Taxa named by Franz Steindachner
Fish described in 1911